is a Japanese footballer currently playing as a left-back for Renofa Yamaguchi FC.

Club career
Nakagawa made his professional debut on 3 July 2019 in an Emperor's Cup game against Kagoshima United.

Career statistics

Club
.

Notes

References

External links

2000 births
Living people
Japanese footballers
Association football defenders
Avispa Fukuoka players
Renofa Yamaguchi FC players
J2 League players
Sportspeople from Fukuoka Prefecture